Marfilmes is a Portuguese distributor specialized in Portuguese-speaking cinema from classics to moderns, dealing particularly with Portuguese-African speaking films. The company collaborated with the African Film Library and increased the scope of its titles to classical African films of different origins and languages.

Marfilmes has a large experience within Portuguese cinema, contributing to that the years of exclusive collaboration with Rádio e Televisão de Portugal (RTP), the state Portuguese television.

African films distributed by Marfilmes

Films and Filmmakers Film distributed by Portuguese Marfilmes

External links
 www.marfilmes.com
 Marfilmes at IMDb

Film distributors
Film organisations in Portugal
African cinema
 Marfilmes